Harry Nolte (born 11 June 1961) is an East German sprint canoeist who competed in the 1980s. He won two a bronze medal in the K-1 1000 m event at the 1986 ICF Canoe Sprint World Championships in Montreal.

Nolte also finished fifth in the K-2 1000 m event at the 1980 Summer Olympics in Moscow.

References

Sports-reference.com profile

1961 births
Canoeists at the 1980 Summer Olympics
German male canoeists
Living people
Olympic canoeists of East Germany
ICF Canoe Sprint World Championships medalists in kayak